The rolling globe or walking globe is a circus skill in which a performer balances atop a large sphere. Various gymnastic or juggling stunts may be performed while the performer moves and controls the position of the ball with their feet and/or hands.

Further reading
 Lauriere, Ludovic. Petit traité d'équilibre sur boule. TheBookEdition. 

Circus skills